Halasinakatte is a remote village located in Sirsi Taluk of Uttara Kannada district of Karnataka.

Villages in Uttara Kannada district